Sorgues is a commune in the southeastern French department of Vaucluse. The river Ouvèze, a tributary of the Rhône, as well as its tributary Sorgue, which begins at the Fontaine de Vaucluse, run through the commune. Sorgues, which had a population of 18,680 in 2017, is located just north of Avignon, on the border with Gard.

History
According to The Autobiography of Alice B. Toklas by Gertrude Stein, Georges Braque lived in Sorgues after being wounded during the First World War.

Population

See also
 Communes of the Vaucluse department
 Châteauneuf-du-Pape AOC

References

Communes of Vaucluse